Frank Irving Cleve (December 20, 1899 – August 12, 1970) was an American football, basketball, and baseball coach and minor league baseball player. He served as the head football coach at Concordia College in Moorhead, Minnesota from 1926 to 1935, compiling a record of 30–30–13. Cleve was also the head basketball coach at Concordia from 1927 to 1936, tallying a mark of 86–84.

Cleve died on August 12, 1970, at South Fairview Hospital in Edina, Minnesota, following an illness that began in January of that year.

Head coaching record

College football

References

External links
 

1899 births
1970 deaths
American football ends
Baseball second basemen
Baseball third basemen
Forwards (basketball)
Aberdeen Grays players
Lincoln Links players
Concordia Cobbers baseball coaches
Concordia Cobbers football coaches
Concordia Cobbers men's basketball coaches
Sioux Falls Canaries players
Sioux Falls Soos players
St. Olaf Oles baseball players
St. Olaf Oles football players
St. Olaf Oles men's basketball players
High school basketball coaches in Minnesota
High school football coaches in Minnesota
Junior college baseball coaches in the United States
Junior college football coaches in the United States
Junior college men's basketball coaches in the United States
Sports coaches from Minneapolis
Coaches of American football from Minnesota
Players of American football from Minneapolis
Baseball coaches from Minnesota
Baseball players from Minneapolis
Basketball coaches from Minnesota
Basketball players from Minneapolis